Anelasmocephalus is a genus of harvestmen belonging to the family Trogulidae.

The species of this genus are found in Europe.

Species

Species:

Anelasmocephalus balearicus 
Anelasmocephalus brignolii 
Anelasmocephalus calcaneatus

References

Harvestmen